Fotomuseum Winterthur is a museum of photography in Winterthur, Switzerland.

History

The museum was founded in 1993 and is dedicated to photography as art form and document, and as a representation of reality. Fotomuseum Winterthur is an art gallery for photography by contemporary photographers and artists; a traditional museum for works by 19th and 20th century masters; and a cultural-historical, sociological museum of applied photography in the fields of industry, architecture, fashion, etc. (with exhibitions on police photography, industrial photography, dam-construction photography, medical photography etc.). These three orientations form the basis of the museum's exhibition program and accompanying publications and events.

On the new expanded premises, and in addition to the changing exhibitions, Fotomuseum Winterthur presents changing shows of works from its collection of contemporary photography.

Fotomuseum Winterthur is located at Grüzenstrasse 44 and 45, in two buildings on opposite sides of the road. The exhibition area is 1000m2 and the total area (including the area shared with Fotostiftung Schweiz) is 3000m2.

Contemporary photographers and artists that have exhibited at Fotomuseum Winterthur include Lewis Baltz, William Eggleston, Nan Goldin, Andreas Gursky, Roni Horn, and Boris Mikhailov. 19th and 20th century masters that have exhibited at Karl Blossfeldt, Bill Brandt, Dorothea Lange, Lisette Model, Albert Renger-Patzsch, August Sander, Charles Sheeler, Edward Weston, and Weegee.

Location
Together, Fotomuseum Winterthur (FMW) and Fotostiftung Schweiz (FSS) constitute the new Center of Photography in Winterthur, which occupies buildings on either side of Grüzenstrasse. The existing premises of the FMW in Grüzenstrasse 44 accommodate the changing exhibition rooms, rooms for museum pedagogics, offices, a workshop, and storage. The new building accommodates the exhibition rooms for the FMW collection and rooms for all joint functions of the FMW and the FSS: library, seminar rooms, collection storage rooms, museum shop, and the museum bistro "George" (run by Chantal Aloui).

The collection 
Since the foundation of Fotomuseum Winterthur in 1993, building up a collection of contemporary photography has been a major cornerstone of the museum's activities. To date, some 4000 photographs have been purchased, donated or given on permanent loan. Every year since 2003, parts of the collection are presented in specially curated exhibitions accompanied by a series of publications (Set 1, 2, 3, 4 …). The collection can be viewed online.

The collection includes work by Nobuyoshi Araki, Vanessa Beecroft, Lewis Baltz, Daniele Buetti, Larry Clark, Hans Danuser, William Eggleston, Nicolas Faure, Hans-Peter Feldmann, Robert Frank, Nan Goldin, Paul Graham, Andreas Gursky, Roni Horn, Axel Hütte, Urs Lüthi, Boris Mikhailov, Arnold Odermatt, Gilles Peress, Liza May Post, Thomas Ruff, and Annelies Štrba.

Group exhibitions
The museum is also responsible for curating group exhibitions combining photography and visual arts. Beastly/Tierisch is an example of a group exhibition, organised in 2015 and curated by Duncan Forbes. This exhibition brought about thirty international artists reworking categories of representation to examine human-animal relations, including Katja Novitskova, Xiaoxiao Xu, Hiroshi Sugimoto, Erik Kessels, Filip Gilissen, Chris Marker and Charlotte Dumas, and is accompanied by a catalogue with illustrations and essays from artists and writers like Ana Teixeira Pinto and Slavoj Žižek.

SITUATIONS
In 2015, Dr. Duncan Forbes established an exhibition programme that offers a unique perspective on photographic culture in the digital age. This innovative platform is titled SITUATIONS and has featured works by Ryan Trecartin, Constant Dullaart, Jon Rafman, Vito Acconci and  
Mel Bochner. Situations is successfully continued by current director Nadine Wietlisbach.

The Forum for New European Photography 
Each year at the last weekend of January, Plat(t)form, the Forum for New European Photography, takes place in the Fotomuseum Winterthur. This is an extraordinary opportunity for forty-two "emerging artists” each year to introduce themselves to the public and to a team of experts. Young, new, complex visual worlds are presented and publicly discussed. The standard of the young photographers is exceptionally high thanks to a double jury process (nomination and selection). For the photographers and experts, but also for curators, publishers, collectors, gallerists, and the public, this weekend is an exciting visual experience with engaging discussions and intensive networking. The Plat(t)form Databank is a unique online opportunity to learn more about recent European photography.

References

External links 

Photography museums and galleries in Switzerland
1993 establishments in Switzerland
Art museums established in 1993
Museums in the canton of Zürich